Diary of a Mad Housewife is a 1970 American comedy-drama film about a frustrated wife portrayed by Carrie Snodgress. Snodgress was nominated for the Academy Award for Best Actress and won a Golden Globe award in the same category. The film was adapted by Eleanor Perry from the 1967 novel by Sue Kaufman and directed by Perry's then-husband Frank Perry. The film co-stars Richard Benjamin and Frank Langella.

Plot
Tina Balser, an educated, frustrated housewife and mother, is in a loveless marriage with Jonathan, an insufferable, controlling, emotionally abusive, social-climbing lawyer in New York City. He treats her like a servant, undermines her with insults, and belittles her appearance, abilities, and the raising of their two girls, who treat their mother with the same rudeness as their father. Searching for relief, she begins a sexually fulfilling affair with a cruel and coarse writer, George Prager, who treats her with similar brusqueness and contempt, which only drives her deeper into despair. She then tries group therapy, but this also proves fruitless when she finds her male psychiatrist, Dr. Linstrom, as well as the other participants equally shallow and abusive.

At the climax of the film, Jonathan confesses to Tina that his ambitious plans have collapsed. A French vineyard he had invested in is wiped out, and he is now in debt. Because he has been focusing on non-job issues, his work at his law firm has suffered. He also confesses to having an affair. Tina tells Jonathan that she accepts what he's done and promises to support him, but does not tell him of her own affair with George. Tina reveals her story to her therapy group, who angrily criticize or belittle her. The final shot is of Tina's steadfast face as angry voices from the group are heard from off-screen with the credits rolling at the sides.

Cast
 Carrie Snodgress as Bettina "Tina" Balser
 Richard Benjamin as Jonathan Balser
 Frank Langella as George Prager
 Lorraine Cullen as Sylvie Balser
 Frannie Michel as Liz Balser
 Lee Addoms as Mrs. Prinz
 Peter Dohanos as Samuel Keefer
 Katherine Meskill as Charlotte Rady
 Leonard Elliott as M. Henri
 Margo as Valma
 Hilda Haynes as Lottie
 The Alice Cooper Band as Themselves
 Lester Rawlins as Dr. Linstrom (uncredited)
 Peter Boyle as Man in group therapy (uncredited)

Release

Critical response
The film was critically acclaimed: It maintains an 82% rating at Rotten Tomatoes from 17 reviews. Roger Ebert gave the movie three out of four stars, writing "What makes the movie work...is that it's played entirely from the housewife's point of view, and that the housewife is played brilliantly by Carrie Snodgress."

Neil Young wrote the song "A Man Needs a Maid" inspired by Snodgress in Diary of a Mad Housewife: "I was watching a movie with a friend/I fell in love with the actress/she was playing a part I could understand." The song was included on his 1972 album Harvest. Soon after, Young and Snodgress became romantically involved for several years.

Groucho Marx criticized the movie in an interview on The Dick Cavett Show on May 25, 1971. He stated that it was an example of dirty entertainment and that he did not like it because the characters were in bed for 80 minutes. He made a joke of this, saying "Well I'm not interested in that. I don't care what they're doing in the sack. If I'm not doing it, why should I sit in the theater and watch it?"

Awards and nominations

Home media
The film was released on a bootleg DVD on October 15, 2014; VHS copies of Housewife have become rare, with sealed copies routinely selling for more than $100 on websites like Amazon.com and eBay. Universal had made the film available on VHS through its MCA label, and through license to Goodtimes Home Video. After years of being out-of-print, Kino Lorber released the film on DVD and Blu-ray on December 15, 2020.

References

External links

1970 films
1970 comedy films
1970 comedy-drama films
1970s feminist films
1970s sex comedy films
Adultery in films
American comedy-drama films
American feminist films
American sex comedy films
1970s English-language films
Films based on American novels
Films directed by Frank Perry
Films featuring a Best Musical or Comedy Actress Golden Globe winning performance
Films set in New York City
Films shot in New York City
Universal Pictures films
1970 drama films
1970s American films